Public holidays in Jordan.

Note: Holidays in Jordan are often flexible. It is common for the government to change the day which a holiday is supposed to be celebrated on to another day — usually to prolong weekend.

References

Jordan
Society of Jordan
Jordanian culture
Jordan